Mike McLean was an Australian sports broadcaster.

McLean was educated at St Bede's College in Mentone, Victoria.

He began his media career in the early part of the 1990s in Canberra, spending two years there before moving to Shepparton, Victoria where he worked in various roles both on and off-air at 3SR and SUN FM.

After calling football on 3SR for two years he was offered a calling position with Magic 693 on their AFL coverage. In 1999 the AFL did not renew the calling contract of Magic 693 so McLean moved to Triple M to head up their new AFL coverage in South Australia. Since then McLean was a member of the Triple M Football team broadcasting matches on Triple M stations in Melbourne, Sydney, Adelaide and Brisbane.

McLean also commentated on a wide range of other sports and has received two Australian Commercial Radio Awards.

McLean was known by the nicknames "Magic" or "Madge".

Mike McLean died of cancer in August 2009.

External links
Triple M profile

Australian rules football commentators
Year of birth missing (living people)
Triple M presenters
Living people